nGéadal (Ngéadal or Ngeadal) is the Irish name of the thirteenth letter of the Ogham alphabet, ᚍ.

The Bríatharogam (kennings) for the letter are:
lúth lego "sustenance of a leech"  
étiud midach "raiment of physicians"  
tosach n-échto "beginning of slaying"

Its meaning is probably "[the act of] wounding". In Old Irish, the letter name was Gétal. It may be a verbal noun of gonid 'wounds, slays'. in which case is related to Welsh gwanu 'to pierce, to stab', which comes from the root was * 'to pierce, to strike'. In Old Irish, this phoneme merged with g (gort), and the medieval manuscript tradition assigns it Latin ng , hence the unetymological spelling of the letter name with initial n-.

References
Damian McManus, Irish letter-names and their kennings, Ériu 39 (1988), 127-168.

Ogham letters